Mount Hubley is the second highest peak in the Brooks Range, Alaska, USA. Mount Hubley is within the Arctic National Wildlife Refuge and was named in 1958 for Dr. Richard Carleton Hubley, a coordinator for the International Geophysical Year who died in 1957 while doing research on the adjacent McCall Glacier. In 2014 new measurement technology established that Mount Hubley is the second highest peak in the Brooks Range after Mount Isto. Previously, Mount Chamberlin was believed to be the tallest, but it is now ranked third.

References

Mountains of Alaska
Mountains of North Slope Borough, Alaska
Brooks Range